Michael George Wright (8 September 1922 – 20 September 2001) was a Singaporean field hockey player. He competed in the men's tournament at the 1956 Summer Olympics.

References

External links
 
 

1922 births
2001 deaths
Singaporean male field hockey players
Olympic field hockey players of Singapore
Field hockey players at the 1956 Summer Olympics
Place of birth missing
Malaysian emigrants to Singapore
Singaporean emigrants to New Zealand
20th-century Singaporean people